The Chalukyas of Lata were an Indian dynasty, which ruled the Lata region of present-day Gujarat during 10th and 11th centuries. They ruled as feudatories of the Western Chalukyas in their early years, and were ultimately defeated by the Chaulukyas of Gujarat (Solankis).

History 
Barappa, the dynasty's first ruler, is identified as a general of the Western Chalukya king Tailapa II. He might have been made the governor of the Lata region by Tailapa. According to Merutunga's Prabandha-Chintamani, Barapa and the ruler of Sapadalaksha (the Chahamana king Vigraharaja II) once simultaneously attacked Gujarat. Mularaja, the Chaulukya king of Gujarat, asked the Sapadalaksha ruler not to attack him until he dealt with Barapa. He then defeated Barapa, which prompted the Sapadalaksha king to flee Gujarat. Since Merutunga was from Gujarat, this account may be biased. The Chahamana chroniclers claim that Vigraharaja defeated Mularaja, and marched up to Bhrigukachchha, where he constructed a temple dedicated to his family deity Ashapura. According to one theory, Vigraharaja II allied with Barapa, and helped him achieve independence.

According to Hemachandra's Dvyashraya Kavya, Mularaja's son Chamundaraja invaded Lata, and killed Barappa. Barappa's son Gogi-raja may have revived the family's rule in the Lata region. But, by 1074 CE, the dynasty appears to have been vanquished by the Chaulukyas of Gujarat.

Genealogy 
The following members of the family (with estimated reigns) are known:

 Nimbarka
 Barappa, c. 970-990 CE
 Gogi-raja or Gongi-raja, c. 990-1010 CE
 Kirti-raja, c. 1010-1030 CE
 Vatsa-raja, c. 1030-1050 CE
 Trilochana-pala, c. 1050-1070 CE

Inscriptions 
A 940 Shaka (1018 CE) copper-plate inscription of Kirtiraja was discovered in Surat. It names his ancestors as Gogi, Barappa and Nimbarka.

Two copper-plate inscriptions of Trilochana-pala dated 972 Shaka (1050 CE Eklahare and 1051 CE Surat) have also been discovered. These inscriptions given an account of the mythical origin of the Chalukyas: the family's progenitor originated from the chuluka (a vessel or a folded palm to hold water) of the creator deity Virinchi. On the deity's advice, he married the Rashtrakuta princess of Kanyakubja. Trilochanapala's inscriptions mention four of his ancestors: Vatsa, Kirti, Gogi and Barappa. Vatsa is said to have built a golden umbrella for the god Somanatha, and also established a free food canteen (sattra). Trilochanapala is titled Maha-Mandaleshvara in these inscriptions. The 1050 CE inscription records his donation of the Ekallahara village (modern Eklahare) to a Brahmin named Taraditya.

References

History of Gujarat
Dynasties of India
970s establishments
10th-century establishments in India
11th-century disestablishments in India